The American Heritage Dictionary of the English Language (AHD) is an American dictionary of English published by Boston publisher Houghton Mifflin, the first edition of which appeared in 1969. Its creation was spurred by the controversy over the perceived permissiveness of the Webster's Third New International Dictionary. The third edition included over 350,000 entries and meanings.

History 
James Parton (1912–2001) was a grandson of the English-born American biographer James Parton (1822–1891). He was the founder, publisher and co-owner of the magazines American Heritage and Horizon, and was appalled by the permissiveness of Webster's Third, published in 1961. (Webster's Third presented all entries without labeling them correct or incorrect.) Parton tried to buy the G. and C. Merriam Company so that he could undo the changes. When that failed, he contracted with Houghton to publish a new dictionary. The AHD was edited by William Morris and relied on a usage panel of 105 writers, speakers, and eminent persons chosen for their well-known conservatism in the use of language. However, Morris made inconsistent use of the panels, often ignoring their advice and inserting his own opinions.

Linguistics
The AHD broke ground among dictionaries by using corpus linguistics for compiling word frequencies and other information. It took the innovative step of combining prescriptive information (how language should be used) and descriptive information (how it actually is used). The descriptive information was derived from  actual texts.

Citations were based on a million-word, three-line citation database prepared by Brown University linguist Henry Kučera.

Usage panel
For expert consultation on words or constructions whose usage was controversial or problematic, the American Heritage Dictionary relied on the advice of a usage panel. In its final form, the panel comprised nearly 200 prominent members of professions whose work demanded sensitivity to language. Former members of the usage panel include novelists (Isaac Asimov, Barbara Kingsolver, David Foster Wallace and Eudora Welty), poets (Rita Dove, Galway Kinnell, Mary Oliver and Robert Pinsky), playwrights (Terrence McNally and Marsha Norman), journalists (Liane Hansen and Susan Stamberg), literary critics (Harold Bloom), columnists and commentators (William F. Buckley, Jr. and Robert J. Samuelson), linguists and cognitive scientists (Anne Curzan, Steven Pinker and Calvert Watkins) and humorists (Garrison Keillor, David Sedaris and Alison Bechdel). Pinker, author of the style guide The Sense of Style, was its final chair.

The members of the panel were sent regular ballots asking about matters of usage; the completed ballots were returned and tabulated, and the results formed the basis for special usage notes appended to the relevant dictionary entries. In many cases, these notes not only reported the percentage of panelists who considered a given usage or construction to be acceptable, but would also report the results from balloting of the same question in past decades, to give a clearer sense of how the language changes over time.

Houghton Mifflin dissolved the usage panel on February 1, 2018, citing the decline in demand for print dictionaries.

Illustrations
The AHD is also somewhat innovative in its liberal use of photographic illustrations, which at the time was highly unusual for general reference dictionaries, many of which went largely or completely unillustrated. It also has an unusually large number of biographical entries for notable persons.

First edition
The first edition appeared in 1969, highly praised for its Indo-European etymologies. In addition to the normally expected etymologies, which for instance trace the word ambiguous to a Proto-Indo-European root ag-, meaning "to drive," the appendices included a seven-page article by Professor Calvert Watkins entitled "Indo-European and the Indo-Europeans" and "Indo-European Roots", 46 pages of entries that are each organized around one of some thousand Proto-Indo-European roots and the English words of the AHD that are understood to have evolved from them. These entries might be called "reverse etymologies": the ag- entry there, for instance, lists 49 terms derived from it, words as diverse as agent, essay, purge, stratagem, ambassador, axiom, and pellagra, along with information about varying routes through intermediate transformations on the way to the contemporary words.

A compacted American Heritage College Dictionary was first released in 1974.

Second and later editions
The first edition's concise successor, The American Heritage Dictionary, Second College Edition was published in 1982 (without a larger-format version). It omitted the Indo-European etymologies, but they were reintroduced in the third full edition, published in 1992. The third edition was also a departure for the publisher because it was developed in a database, which facilitated the use of the linguistic data for other applications, such as electronic dictionaries.

The fourth edition (2000, reissued in 2006) added an appendix of Semitic language etymological roots, and included color illustrations, and was also available with a CD-ROM edition in some versions. This revision was larger than a typical desk dictionary but smaller than Webster's Third New International Dictionary or the unabridged Random House Dictionary of the English Language. A lower-priced college edition, also the fourth, was issued in black-and-white printing and with fewer illustrations, in 2002 (reprinted in 2007 and 2010).

The fifth and most recent full edition was published in November 2011, with new printings in 2012,  2016, and a 50th Anniversary Printing in 2018, which the publisher states is a "comprehensive update" of the 2011 edition, containing "... [t]housands of revisions to definitions and etymologies, 150 new words and senses, and new usage advice ...."

The various printings of the 5th edition are available in hardcover and, with reduced print size and smaller page count, trade paperback form. The 5th edition dropped several of the supplementary features of the fourth edition, and is not available with a disc-based electronic version. The university-student version was renamed The American Heritage College Writer's Dictionary in 2013, and stripped of biographical and geographical entries to make room for more vocabulary while simultaneously reducing the number of pages compared to the fourth college edition.

The AHD inserts minor revisions (such as a biographical entry, with photograph, for each newly elected U.S. president) in successive printings of any given edition.

Supporting volumes have been issued, including The American Heritage Book of English Usage, The American Heritage Dictionary of Indo-European Roots, The American Heritage Abbreviations Dictionary, The American Heritage Dictionary of Idioms, The American Heritage Thesaurus in various sizes; usage dictionaries of special vocabulary such as The American Heritage Science Dictionary, The American Heritage Medical Dictionary and The American Heritage Dictionary of Business Terms; plus special dictionary editions for children, high-school students, and English-language learners.  The American Heritage brand is also used for a series of American history books.

See also
List of dictionaries by number of words
Phonetic notation of the American Heritage Dictionary

References

External links
  of the American Heritage Dictionary of the English Language
 Members of the Usage Panel
 The American Heritage Dictionary Indo-European Roots Appendix 

 The American Heritage Dictionary Software
Boston Globe review of the AHD 3rd edition (1992)

1969 non-fiction books
English dictionaries
Works about American English